Yeo Bee Yin (born 26 May 1983) is a Malaysian politician from the Democratic Action Party (DAP), a component party of the Pakatan Harapan (PH) coalition. She served as the Minister of Energy, Science, Technology, Environment and Climate Change in the PH administration under former Prime Minister Mahathir Mohamad from July 2018 to the collapse of the PH administration in February 2020. She has served as the Member of Parliament (MP) for Puchong since November 2022 and for Bakri from May 2018 to November 2022. She also served as Member of the Selangor State Legislative Assembly (MLA) for Damansara Utama from May 2013 to May 2018 and Assistant National Publicity Secretary of DAP from November 2017 to March 2022.

Early life
Yeo was born on 26 May 1983, and started growing up in Gomali Estate before moving to a small town, Batu Anam in Segamat at the northern part of Johor.

Education
Yeo attended National Junior College (Singapore). She graduated from Universiti Teknologi Petronas (UTP) with First Class Honors in Chemical Engineering under the Petronas Scholarship in 2006. After two years working with Schlumberger, she went on to pursue an MPhil (Masters in Philosophy) in Advanced Chemical Engineering at Corpus Christi College, Cambridge, under the Gates Cambridge Scholarship by the Bill and Melinda Gates Foundation, and completed her degree with a Commendation.

Political career

Yeo had been volunteering for DAP since February 2012 before joining the party permanently with another academician, Dr Ong Kian Ming, in August the same year. While running her own business, she was also the social media strategic advisor to the party, as well as special assistant to Tony Pua, the MP of Petaling Jaya Utara.

She is also the National Assistant Publicity Secretary of the DAP, Vice Chairperson of Pakatan Harapan Youth, and Political Education Director of DAP Wanita Selangor.

In the 2013 general election (GE13), Yeo contested for the first time and won the Selangor State Legislative Assembly constituency for Damansara Utama on a DAP ticket with 83.6% of the votes and a 30,689 majority, the highest majority for state seats in Malaysia. She was the youngest member of the  Selangor State Legislative Assembly then. Following her election, Yeo said that her main priorities were decreasing the high crime rates, traffic jams, as well as combating flash floods and poverty.

In March 2017, Yeo questioned the finances of the PERMATApintar (commonly known just as PERMATA) programme, a child education and welfare programme, of which Prime Minister Najib Razak's wife, Rosmah Mansor is the patron, urging for the transparency of the organisation's financial accounts.

Yeo also questioned the need for a separate agency under the Prime Minister's Department with Rosmah, an individual not elected by the people, to have such a significant role in government, saying that early childhood development programmes such as PERMATA should be under the respective full ministries which are more equipped and have the personnel with more experience in the field.

Yeo was picked by DAP to contest in the 2018 general election (GE14) as the Pakatan Harapan candidate for the Bakri parliamentary seat in Johor and elected to the Parliament.

Minister of Energy, Science, Technology, Environment and Climate Change 
Yeo was appointed and sworn in as Minister of Energy, Technology, Science, Climate Change and Environment on 2 July 2018, as part of Prime Minister Mahathir's 7th Cabinet. The ministry was later renamed as Ministry of Energy, Science, Technology, Environment and Climate Change (MESTECC) on 2 August 2018 for acronym convenience purposes.

Amongst her early actions as minister was to announce an increase of renewable energy goals from 2% to 20% by 2030.  She has also initiated a refurbishment of government buildings to lead on efficient energy consumption.

She has helped to set up a nationwide ban on the import of plastic waste and published a 12-year roadmap that includes a legal framework in eliminating the use of single use plastics in Malaysia by 2030.  Within a few short months as minister, her work on the environment had already garnered recognition from the journal Nature.

"Roadmap Towards Zero Single-Use Plastic" 2018–2030
According to a scientific study published in the journal Science in 2015, Malaysia is ranked 8th in mismanaged plastic wastes. Mismanagement of plastic waste will impact the environment, health and economy of the country. There are also plastics that will decompose into micro-plastic that can enter the food chain and affect aquatic life and human health. Therefore, Malaysia Roadmap Towards Zero Single-Use Plastic by 2030 launched in October 2018 is a guideline for the nation to implement actions in phases for the next 12 years leading to 2030. The roadmap is a living document which allows the state governments to roll out the initiatives and implementation of policies according to each state level of awareness and readiness within the time frame set by MESTECC.

Cancellation of Four IPPs
The Malaysian Government has decided to cancel four Independent Power Producer (IPP)s' contracts, awarded through direct negotiations, for failing to adhere to conditions stipulated in the respective offer letters. This announcement was made in a reply by Minister of Energy, Science, Technology, Environment and Climate Change Yeo Bee Yin to a question from Ipoh Timur MP Wong Kah Woh in Parliament on 25 October 2018.

The four cancelled IPPs were Malakoff Corp Bhd and Tenaga Nasional Bhd's 700MW gas powered plant in Kapar, Selangor; Aman Majestic Sdn Bhd and Tenaga Nasional's 1,400MW plant in Paka, Terengganu; Sabah Development Energy (Sandakan) Sdn Bhd and SM Hydro Energy Sdn Bhd hydropower plant at the Palm Oil Industrial Cluster (POIC) in Sandakan, Sabah and The solar power quota of 400MW to Edra Power Holdings Sdn Bhd for the utilisation of solar power plant.

If the national electric reserve margin remained at the optimal 32% and if these projects were allowed to continue, it would increase the reserve margin to 46%, which is a level above what is required.  When capacity payments increase, so will the electric bills. The cancellations had allowed the Government to achieve a savings of RM1.26 billion in electric supply.

Feed-in Tariff (Fit) Quota Revocation and New Quota Release
A total of 156MW (155.7256MW) renewable energy quota revoked in September 2018 allowing for 115MW (114.5682MW) on offer in the fourth quarter of 2018. The quota will be opened for application in batches.

The mini hydro will have a quota of 74.5682 MW for application expected to achieve commercial operations by 2020 and 2021. The quota allocated for biogas and biomass are 30MW and 10MW respectively; these quota are for applications achieving commercial operations by 2021.

That is the first time Sustainable Energy Development Authority (SEDA) had opens the e-bidding for biogas in Feed in Tariff system aiming to create better pricing efficiency for electricity generated from the biogas resources through healthy competition.

Solar PV Initiatives - Improvement of Net Energy Metering (NEM) and Solar Leasing
Towards the end of 2016, the Malaysian Government had introduced the Net Energy Metering(NEM) programme to encourage installation of rooftop Solar PV to generate renewable energy for consumption and to export back to the grid and the producer-consumers will be paid back with the displaced cost through the electricity bill.

The quota that was determined in 2016 was 500MW for the period of 5 years from 2016 to 2020. The breakdown was 120MW for domestic users, 195MW for commercial and 185MW for industrial. However, two years after the launched the uptake rate was very low at about 17MW or 3.4%.

To improve the implementation of NEM, the MESTECC implemented initiatives for domestic, commercial and industrial users.

For domestic users, the Government will improve NEM by allowing the additional energy that is generated to be exported back to the grid, on a one-to-one offset. This means every 1kWh generated will be off-set against 1 kWh utilized by the customer, instead of at the previously quoted displaced costs. Through this initiative, MESTECC hopes the uptake for the NEM will increase as subsequently reduces the cost of energy for domestic users.

For the commercial and industrial users, the Government has agreed to implement NEM through the solar leasing mechanism using the Supply Agreement for Renewable Energy (SARE). Through this method, the cost for purchasing and installation of Solar PVs, electricity generation revenue, and electricity tariff will be agreed upon by three parties between Customers, Investors/Owners of PV Panels and the utility company (TNB). This initiative frees the customers from paying for the upfront cost. The installation and Solar PV cost will be borne by Investors and utility company.

NEM was first implemented at the end of 2016 and the total approved capacity as at end 2018, was 27.81 MW. Since January 2019, the NEM scheme was enhanced to allow surplus solar electricity to be sold on a 1-on-1 basis. To date, SEDA Malaysia has approved up to 58.6 MW under the enhanced NEM programme.

Open Tender for Large Scale Solar Projects (LSS3)
In February 2019, the Malaysia government had called for bids for RM2 billion worth of projects under the third round of the large-scale solar (LSS3) scheme to increase electricity generation from renewable energy. The competitive bidding process was opened for a six-month period from February to August 2019.

In the LSS3 bidding which ended in August 2019, saw the cost of generating per kilowatt-hour (kWh) from solar energy was lower than energy generation from natural gas sources because of improvements in technology and the adoption of open bidding for power projects. The four lowest bids, which encompassed 365 MW out of 500 MW, came below the current cost of gas-fired power generation of 23.22 sen per kWh, with the lowest bid being 17.77 sen per kWh. This marks a 45% reduction from the lowest price of 32 sen per kWh for the second round of the Large Solar Project (LSS2) bid a few years ago.

Yeo is expecting that the upcoming 500MW plant would likely close below 24 sen per kWh, pending technical evaluation. Malaysia will see a more competitive and diversified power generation mix as technological advances in renewable energy and rising demand have made the access to the technology cheaper, contributing to a lower cost of electricity generation.

Yeo also noted that Malaysia needed investments totalling RM33 billion in order to achieve its target of 20 percent electricity generation from renewable energy sources by 2025. Meantime, the Securities Commission has conducted a six-month study on green financing by forming a task force to provide a report on 21 action items for the facilitation of the RM33 billion investments into renewable energy. The Malaysian Government is committed to continue the current incentives for green investment for example Green Technology Financing Scheme, Green Investment Tax Allowance and Green Income Tax Exemption.

The Second Biogas E-bidding Exercise and The First E-bidding for Small Hydro Power Systems
Sustainable Energy Development Authority (SEDA) Malaysia is completing second biogas e-bidding exercise and inaugural e-bidding for small hydro power systems.

In a statement dated 23 July 2019, Yeo said the aim of the e-bidding process is to facilitate price discovery for renewable energy (RE) generated from biogas and small hydro resources, through healthy competition.

Feed-in Tariff (FiT) scheme had traditionally offered tariff at fixed rate. Having implemented the FiT for seven years, SEDA had improved price discovery of the tariff offered to renewable energy developer by way of competitive bidding. The inaugural e-bidding exercise for biogas was carried out in the fourth quarter of 2018. The schedule of e-bidding under the current phase includes 30MW and 160MW for biogas and small hydro respectively.

As at end of June 2019, SEDA approved 12,540 Feed-in Tariff (FiT) applications with a total capacity of 1,744.38 MW. This comprised 34.6 percent (small hydro), 25.4 percent (solar PV), 23.5 percent (biomass), 14.4 percent (biogas) and 2.1 percent (geothermal).

Meanwhile, the total RE projects achieving commercial operation was 10,254 with total installed capacity of 621.96 MW (61.8 percent solar PV, 15.4 percent biomass, 11.5 percent biogas and 11.3 percent small hydro.

Energy Efficiency and Conservation Act (EECA)
A joint study by the Malaysian Government's Economic Planning Unit (EPU) and the United Nations Development Programme (UNDP) estimated that Malaysia had potential energy savings of up RM46.92 billion from 2016 to 2030. The study shows that the main obstacle from widespread use of energy efficient practices is the lack of regulatory framework. Therefore, MESTECC is working on the framework for the Energy Efficiency and Conservation Act (EECA), the act is expected to be tabled in the Dewan Rakyat at the end of 2019.

Energy Performance Contract (EPC)
Apart from drafting the Energy Efficiency and Conservation Act, MESTECC has also reviewed and improved the National Energy Efficiency Action Plan (NEEAP) 2016-2025 and has set a new target to achieve at least 8 percent saving through energy efficiency by 2025.
MESTECC will focus on energy efficiency in the building sector as it has been identified internationally as one of the most cost-effective sectors to reduce energy consumption.

Building electricity consumption comprises more than 50 percent of the electricity consumption in Malaysia.This shows that there is a great potential for cost savings if Malaysia can improve energy efficiency in buildings.

Decision on Accumulated Radioactive Residue at Lynas Advanced Materials Plant in Gebeng, Kuantan
Following the Executive Review Committee on Operations of Lynas Advance Material Plants (LAMP) in Gebeng which was presented to the MESTECC as scheduled on 27 November 2018, the Ministry is concerned with the increasing risk arising from the continued accumulation of residue without a viable solution to manage its accumulation in the near-term. For this reason, the Ministry will not allow the unlimited accumulation of residue at LAMP.

In this regard, the following pre-conditions will be applied to Lynas Malaysia for future licences/permission renewals:
 The accumulated WLP residue, which contains radioactive materials, must be removed from Malaysia. (Note: the existing temporary storage licence expires on 2 September 2019.) The Ministry notes that Lynas Corporation Ltd., Australia (Lynas Australia) and Lynas Malaysia Sdn. Bhd. (Lynas Malaysia) had each presented letters of undertaking dated 23 February 2012 and 6 March 2012 respectively indicating their commitment to remove LAMP residue from Malaysia, if necessary. 
 For the non-radioactive NUF scheduled waste, LAMP shall submit an action plan on the disposal of its accumulated wastes before it will be considered for future applications under Rule 9 (6) and 9 (7) of the Environmental Quality Regulations (Scheduled Waste) 2005. (Note: the current approval for the storage of scheduled wastes is valid until 15 February 2019).

The Ministry is confident that this decision will help further ensure the well-being of the community and the environment.

Activities outside of parliament 
Yeo's office runs two tuition centres in Damansara Bistari and Kampung Chempaka, which offer free classes for students between the ages of 7 to 17 from low-income families. She also runs a monthly food bank program providing basic necessities assistance to more than 100 people.

She also works with DAP's Impian Malaysia movement, being one of the pioneers of the first Impian Sarawak project in Kampung Sait, Sarawak which works to provide basic infrastructure such as roads, water, and electricity in Sarawak.

She is the founder of LEAP (Leadership, Education, Activism and Politics), which aims to educate students on the political process and activism in Malaysia, such as the formation of political parties, election campaigns, constituency management, media relations, coalition formation and debates.

She is also the founder of the Lawatan Anak Muda (LAM) Programme which allows young participants to visit the Malaysian Parliament and the Selangor State Assembly. Participants get the chance to have a Q&A session with a few Members of Parliament and state assemblypersons.

Controversies

Misappropriation of funds
In March 2017, Jamal Mohd Yunos, the United Malays National Organisation (UMNO) Sungai Besar division chief had alleged that funds from the Selangor state government for the Skim Mesra Usia Emas (SMUE) had been misappropriated by Yeo. Yeo disproved the allegation with documents showing each SMUE payment made. Yeo appeared at the Malaysian Anti-Corruption Commission (MACC) office where Jamal was expected to show up to lodge a report. Yeo brought along a mirror with the words "Nothing to Hide" written on it to be presented to Jamal. Jamal however did not appear to lodge his report and the mirror was instead handed to his representative. Subsequently, Yeo filed a RM5 million suit against Jamal for defamation, in which, Jamal failed to appear at the High Court case management.

MCA land purchase
In September 2017, DAP lawmakers questioned the Malaysian Chinese Association (MCA) about a one-acre plot of land in Kampung Cempaka, Petaling Jaya which was allegedly purchased under market price.

MCA had sought approval to purchase the land from the state government, then under the rule of Barisan Nasional, and acquired in 2007. They then bought the land at RM52,000 at RM1 per square foot when the land was reportedly orth more than RM400 per square feet. Yeo later discovered MCA's plans to convert the land to commercial status and questioned how MCA had managed to purchase it below market price. When former Petaling Jaya Utara MP, Chew Mei Fun of MCA was contacted on the matter, she denied being involved in the land application and declined to explain further.

After the case was exposed to public knowledge, three MCA leaders, MCA Selangor Vice Chairperson Tang Song Chang, MCA Petaling Jaya Utama division chief Tan Gim Tuan, and Chew came forward and claim that the 1 acre plot of land bought was purchased below market price was intended to be used for public service. Yeo challenged the explanation, arguing that if the land was actually for public service, then there would be no need for MCA to own the land instead of the state government. Yeo also requested for evidence or guarantees that MCA intended the land to be used for public service and further questioned the reason MCA applied for the land to be rezoned and converted from a "water body" to "commercial land".

Chew later threatened to sue Yeo and MP for Petaling Jaya Utara, Tony Pua, which they openly welcomed, holding on to their standing that they had not done anything defamatory towards Chew or the MCA by revealing truthful facts.

Personal life
Yeo was married on 11 March 2019 to Lee Yeow Seng, the chief executive officer of IOI Properties Group Bhd. Yeow Seng is also the youngest son of the founder and boss of IOI Group; tycoon Tan Sri Lee Shin Cheng. Yeow Seng and his elder brother, Yeow Chor inherited the estate of their father, who died in June 2019 was listed by Forbes together as the sixth in Malaysia's 50 Richest 2021.On 8 January 2023, Seri Kembangan MLA Ean Yong Hian Wah revealed that Yeo had given birth to her son and third child two days ago on 6 January 2023.

Election results

Awards and recognitions

International honours
Natures 10 - "Top 10 People Who Mattered in Science 2018" - By Nature, a British international journal focusing on scientific and technological research.

7 people who stood up for our planet in 2018 - By Eco-Business, a leading digital media company serving Asia Pacific's clean technology, smart cities, responsible business and sustainable development community.
25 inspirational female climate leaders - "25 female climate leaders shaping 2019"-By The Ecologist a British environmental journal, then magazine, it addressed a wide range of environmental subjects and promoted an ecological systems thinking approach through its news stories, investigations and opinion articles.
2019 Young Global Leaders - "127 Young Global Leaders 2019" - By World Economic Forum

Publications 
Yeo launched her first book, "Reimagining Malaysia" on 14 March 2018.

References

External links
 Yeo Bee Yin's blog
 

Living people
1983 births
People from Johor
Malaysian politicians of Chinese descent
Malaysian people of Hokkien descent
Malaysian people of Chinese descent
Malaysian activists
Malaysian environmentalists
Malaysian women environmentalists
Malaysian engineers
Women chemical engineers
Democratic Action Party (Malaysia) politicians
Energy ministers of Malaysia
Environment ministers of Malaysia
Science ministers of Malaysia
Women government ministers of Malaysia
Members of the Dewan Rakyat
Women members of the Dewan Rakyat
Women in Johor politics
Members of the Selangor State Legislative Assembly
Women MLAs in Selangor
Universiti Teknologi Petronas alumni
Alumni of Corpus Christi College, Cambridge
21st-century Malaysian women politicians
21st-century Malaysian politicians